Espen Hugo Isaksen (born 16 January 1979, in Narvik) is a Norwegian football goalkeeper.

He started his top-level career with Rosenborg BK, but did not make a single league appearance and moved to Byåsen IL, where he spent a season and then played for 2 years for amateur side Oslo Øst. In 2004, he was signed by Stabæk Fotball, but only made 1 league appearance in 2 years he joined Odd Grenland. He retired after the 2008-season and is now the keeper coach for Tromsø IL. He later served as reserve goalkeeper. Isaksen was brought in for one game for Stabæk, because they had no keeper available for the game.

Career statistics

References 
ODD GRENLAND - Espen Isaksen
RBKweb - Espen Isaksen

People from Narvik
Association football goalkeepers
Norwegian footballers
Rosenborg BK players
Byåsen Toppfotball players
Stabæk Fotball players
Odds BK players
Tromsø IL players
Eliteserien players
Norwegian First Division players
1979 births
Living people
Sportspeople from Nordland